O Bobo is a 1987 Portuguese film directed by José Álvaro Morais, produced by António da Cunha Telles and based on a play written by the renowned 19th-century Portuguese writer Alexandre Herculano.

Awards
1987 Locarno International Film Festival
Won: Golden Leopard

References

External links

1987 films
Films directed by José Álvaro Morais
Golden Leopard winners
Portuguese drama films
1980s Portuguese-language films